"Lost Ones" is a diss song by American rapper and singer-songwriter Lauryn Hill. It was released on August 25, 1998, through Ruffhouse and Columbia Records. The song was written by Hill and produced by Hill, alongside Vada Nobles and Che Pope. Despite never naming him in the song, the song is widely presumed to be about Hill's former Fugees Bandmate Wyclef Jean.

The song wasn't released as an official single, however it received significant radio play in the United States, and peaked at number 27 on the Billboard R&B/Hip-Hop Airplay chart. "Lost Ones" received a Grammy Award for Best Rap Solo Performance nomination at the 41st Grammy Awards. Introduced by David Bowie, Hill performed the song at the 1999 MTV Video Music Awards; and earned a nomination for the NAACP Image Award for Outstanding Performance in a Variety Series/Special for the performance.

It is often cited as one of the best diss songs, as well as one of the greatest hip hop songs by many critics. In 2013, Complex named it the best rap song made by a woman. In June 2017, Rolling Stone ranked it 45th on their '100 Greatest Hip Hop Songs of All Time' list, the second highest position for a single by a woman on the list.

Background 
"Lost Ones" was written and recorded at Chung King Studios in New York City, and completed in June 1998 at Tuff Gong Studios in Kingston, Jamaica, the song makes mention of this with the lyrics "I was hopeless, now I’m on Hope Road," and Hill figuratively and literally was: Tuff Gong's address is 56 Hope Road. The song is considered to be a nameless diss track aimed towards Hill's former Fugees bandmate Wyclef Jean. Following the split of The Fugees, Hill's former bandmate Jean blamed the split of the group on Hill's pregnancy, his tumultuous relationship with Hill and Jean marrying another woman while being in a relationship with Hill. Shortly after Hill began working on solo projects, ultimately turning down Wyclef Jean's offer to produce an album for Hill after urging her not to start a solo career. According to her former bandmate Pras this led to Hill's animosity towards Jean after she fully supported his solo career and featured on his album, Wyclef Jean Presents The Carnival.

Aftermath 
When asked if he believes the song is about him, Jean responded "personally I don’t take it as a shot". However Fugees member Pras claimed that Jean did think the song was about him when it was released, stating "obviously, he(Jean) thought it was about him. But I think he just kinda shrugged it off."

Legacy

Samples 
Wu-Tang Clan member Inspectah Deck sampled it for his song "Elevation" from his critically acclaimed solo album Uncontrolled Substance (1999). Rapper Fabolous samples the song on his single "Real One". Singer-songwriter H.E.R. flipped "Lost Ones" on her single "Lost Souls" by using a similar flow, drum pattern, and scratches. The song "We Know", written and composed by Lin-Manuel Miranda for the Broadway musical Hamilton references "Lost Ones". Jadakiss also samples the track for his single "Knock Yourself Out" featuring Pharrell Williams. Rapper Lil' Kim referenced The Miseducation of Lauryn Hill on her song "Mis-education of Lil' Kim" (from the 2008 mixtape Ms. G.O.A.T.), which samples "Lost Ones".

Impact and influence 
In a 2014 interview with Vanity Fair, Nas mentioned "Lost Ones" among his favorite songs at the time. He also stated that Hill "created a sound that was timeless", and noted that the song has inspired him. American rapper Rapsody paid tribute to the song while speaking to Billboard, stating that Hill "knew how to incorporate melody into a rhyme so people could sing along with her, even as she was rapping about things that might have been complex", she then added "When I started making music, my cadences weren’t easy to learn, my lyrics were a puzzle. Through studying Lauryn and songs like "Lost Ones," I learned how to simplify".

The song was analyzed and discussed on the first addition of the Spotify music podcast Dissect's mini series segment. According to Pitchfork, writer Joan Morgan hails "Lost Ones" as a "rare opportunity for the cathartic release hip-hop is known for, but one usually associated with testosterone" in her book She Begat This.

Critical reception 
"Lost Ones" has been placed on many critics' lists of the greatest diss songs, as well as the greatest hip hop songs of all time. Music journalist Danyel Smith referred to it as "the greatest diss record of all time". In conversation with Smith, rapper MC Lyte referred to the track as "the most beautifullest diss song". XXL placed it on their list of essential songs by women in hip hop. Christopher John Farley of Time, named it the best hip hop song (radio mix) by a woman, and the second best overall. Rolling Stone ranked it 45th on their '100 Greatest Hip Hop Songs of All Time' list. NME placed it on their list of '19 Of The Fiercest Diss Tracks In Hip-Hop, Rock And Pop History'. Complex ranked it 28th on their list of the '50 Greatest Hip Hop Diss Songs; additionally, it topped their list of the '50 Best Rap Songs Made By Women'.

In 2017, The Boombox ranked the song's opening line "It's funny how money change a situation/Miscommunication lead to complication/My emancipation don't fit your equation" as the best verse by a female rapper, while also referring to it as "one of the dopest hip-hop verses of all-time". BET placed the same verse on their list of 'The 10 Best Verses of All Time'. Music critic Kathy Iandoli placed the song at number two on her ballot of BBC’s 'Greatest Hip Hop songs of all time'. MTV placed it on their list of 'Rap's Top 10 Diss Songs' list. O magazine placed the song on their list of 'The 50 Best Hip Hop songs of All Time'.

Charts

See also 

 List of notable diss tracks

References 

1998 songs
Lauryn Hill songs
Songs written by Lauryn Hill
Diss tracks